Guaviare may refer to:
 Guaviare Department of Colombia
 Guaviare River
 any of several languages named after the river, especially Nukak